Masud Jani was the Governor of Bengal during 1247-1251 CE.

Life
Masud was the son of a previous Bengali governor Alauddin Jani.

Masud Jani was appointed Governor of Bengal after the death of the rebellious Tughlaq Tamar Khan in 1247 CE. He adopted the title Malik al-Muluk ush-Sharq (King of the Eastern kings) after defeating an Odia garrison at Lakhnauti, the old Capital of the Province, however mutinies among his men and Tamar Khan's loyalists prevented him from consolidating on this victories. In 1249, he renovated a sacred building in Gangarampur, Old Malda which was originally built during the reign of Sultan Iltutmish. Jani is referred to in the inscription as "The Great King, Jalal al-Haqq wad-Din, King of the Eastern kings, Masud Shah Jani".

After four years of unsuccessful warfare against King Narasingha Deva I of the Eastern Ganga empire, Masud Jani was removed from office in 1251 CE in favour of the more competent Malik Ikhtiyaruddin Iuzbak.

See also
List of rulers of Bengal
History of Bengal
History of Bangladesh
History of India

References

13th-century Indian Muslims
13th-century Indian monarchs
Governors of Bengal
Year of death unknown
Year of birth unknown